Barbro Hiort af Ornäs (28 August 1921 – 27 November 2015) was a Swedish stage and film actress.

Biography
She was born in Gothenburg, Sweden, the daughter of Alma (née Ärnström) and Erik Hiort af Ornäs. She had a brother, Torbjorn.

Along with Bibi Andersson, Eva Dahlbeck, and Ingrid Thulin, she won the Best Actress Award at the 1958 Cannes Film Festival for Brink of Life. In 1989, she was given the Litteris et Artibus for her services to the arts in Sweden. Hiort af Ornäs died in Bromma on 28 November 2015, aged 94.

Partial filmography

 Imprisoned Women (1943) - Kaj
 Youth in Danger (1946) - Bibbi Nicklasson
 Flickan från tredje raden (1949) - Dagmar Antonsson
 Fiancée for Hire (1950)- Gertrud Stenström
 While the City Sleeps (1950) - Rutan
 Count Svensson (1951) - Greta Svensson
 Barabbas (1953) - Maria of Magdala (uncredited)
 Darling of Mine (1955) - Linda Loy
 Das Fräulein von Scuderi (1955) - La Martiniere
 Sju vackra flickor (1956) - Adele Hellgren
 Vägen genom Skå (1957) - Emma
 Som man bäddar... (1957) - Secretary
 Spielbank-Affäre (1957) - Schulleiterin
 A Guest in His Own House (1957) - Lisen
 Brink of Life (1958) - Nurse Brita
 Pojken i trädet (1961) - Mother
 Lita på mej älskling (1961) - Juror (uncredited)
 All These Women (1964) - Beatrica
 Loving Couples (1964) - Lilian von Pahlen - née Vind-Frijs
 Shame (1968) - Kvinna i flyktingbåten
 ...som havets nakna vind (1968) - Aida
 Som natt och dag (1969) - Madeleine
 Eva - den utstötta (1969) - Jenny Berggren
 The Passion of Anna (1969) - Woman in Dream (uncredited)
 Skräcken har 1000 ögon (1970) - Barbro, Sven's Aunt
 The Touch (1971) - Karin's Mother (uncredited)
 Scenes from a Marriage (1973) - Stefan's mother
 Bröllopet (1973) - Karin Löfgren
 What the Swedish Butler Saw (1975) - Jack's Mother
 Mackan (1977) - Skolkökslärarinna
 Den nya människan (1979) - Lärere
 Father to Be (1979) - Greta, sjuksyster
 Sällskapsresan 2 – Snowroller (1985) - Stig Helmers mamma
 S.O.S. – En segelsällskapsresa (1988) - Stig Helmers mamma
 Amelia (1991) - Yvonne, Gösta's mother
 Den ofrivillige golfaren (1991) - Mamma
 Selma & Johanna - En roadmovie (1997) - Grandma
 Hälsoresan – En smal film av stor vikt (1999) - Mamma
 Den utvalde (2005) - Mormor

References

External links

 

1921 births
2015 deaths
20th-century Swedish actresses
Swedish film actresses
Cannes Film Festival Award for Best Actress winners
People from Gothenburg
Litteris et Artibus recipients